We Hunt Together is a British drama series created by Gaby Hull. The series stars Babou Ceesay, Eve Myles, Hermione Corfield and Dipo Ola. The premiere series debuted on 27 May 2020 on Alibi. The second series premiered on Alibi on 5 May 2022.

Cast

Main
 Babou Ceesay as DI Jackson Mendy
 Hermione Corfield as Frederica "Freddy" Lane
 Eve Myles as DS Lola Franks
 Dipo Ola as Babeni "Baba" Lenga
 Colin Morgan as Liam Gates (season 2)

Recurring
 Babirye Bukilwa as DC Dominique "Dom" Parkes
 Vicki Pepperdine as DSI Susan Smart
 Steffan Rhodri as Larry
 Sharlene Whyte as Gill Mendy
 Nico Mirallegro as Robert Miller (season 2)
 Angus Imrie as Henry Lane (season 2)

Guest

 Kris Marshall as Cian Fitzgerald (season 1)
 Tamzin Outhwaite as Shannon McBride (season 2)
 Michelle Bonnard as Professor Judy Hackwood (season 2)
 Ray Fearon as Chief Superintendent Lester Price (season 2)
 John McCrea as DC Ryan Parsons (season 2)

Episodes
All episodes of the series are written by Gaby Hull.

Series 1 (2020)

Series 2 (2022)

Broadcast and release
The first series premiered in the United Kingdom on Alibi on 27 May 2020. The second series debuted on Alibi on 5 May 2022.

The series premiered in the United States on Showtime on 9 August 2020. The second series debuted on Showtime on 3 July 2022.

References

External links

 

English-language television shows
2020 British television series debuts
2020s British drama television series
Television series by BBC Studios
UKTV original programming
Television shows set in Wales